Yeşilova is a Turkish football club located in the city of Izmir in Turkey. Formed in 1954. The club colours are green, white and brown and they play their home matches at Yusuf Tırpancı Stadium.

Yeşilova is the most successful club of Bornova district of Izmir. Bornova is known as the first place in Turkey where football first was played. Yeşilova represented Izmir in second and third divisions of Turkish leagues for many years. However, they play in amateur leagues since 1997.

League participations 
 TFF Second League	
1980–1983, 	
TFF Third League	
1970–1980, 1983–1997, 1998–1999	
Turkish Regional Amateur League
2012–2013, 2014–	
İzmir Amateur Leagues
1954–1970, 1997–1998, 1999–2012, 2013–2014

References

Football clubs in Turkey
Association football clubs established in 1928
1954 establishments in Turkey